The Implementation Rules are regulations of the PRC, which set the framework of the valid product standards. For each product group there is a specific implementation rule, which is set by the Chinese authorities.

Content of the Implementation Rules 
The Implementation Rules include 12 or 13 chapters, which determine the scope of the product certification. The following table provides an overview of the most common contents of the Implementation Rules:
 Scope
 Terms and definitions
 Standards for certification
 Certification pattern
 Individual product units
 Certification commission
 Certification procedure
 Certificates
 Approval procedure
 Certification logo
 Fees
 Responsibilities
 Certification rules

Update of the Implementation Rules 
In 2014, the Implementation Rules have been updated, so that from 2015 some changes have come into effect. For example, some product groups, which were previously grouped under one Implementation Rule, are now divided and subject to some different Implementation Rules. Furthermore, new products have been added, which are now subject to the mandatory certification. Further factory levels were introduced, so that the companies that carry out a product certification will be assigned a level (A-D) in future. Companies that receive particularly positive results on their products certification will receive level A.

See also 
 Standardization
 Certification

External links 
  承担强制性产品认证工作的认证机构及其业务范围 (business scope of certification bodies undertaken product certifications)

References 

Technical specifications
Standards of the People's Republic of China
Regulation in China